Asafo is a suburb of Kumasi in the Ashanti Region of Ghana. It Can be located around the Ahmadiyya Muslim Mosque and five minutes walk to the Kumasi BABA YARA SPORTS STADIUM.

References

Populated places in the Ashanti Region